Linda Fleming (born in 1945, in Pittsburgh, Pennsylvania) is an American sculpture and university professor. She is currently teaches at California College of the Arts (CCA). She lives and works in Benicia, California, as well as maintaining studios and homes in the Smoke Creek Desert in Nevada, and in Libre, Colorado.

Biography
She attended Peabody High School and received a full scholarship to Carnegie Mellon University.

In 1967, Fleming moved to New York. She connected with the early SoHo art scene in lower Manhattan. Her work was included in the last exhibition of Park Place Gallery, a co-operative founded by artists Dean Fleming, Mark di Suvero, Frosty Myers, Tony Magar, and Tamara Melchert, among others.

After Park Place Gallery closed, Fleming left NYC for Colorado with Dean Fleming. There they co-founded Libre, an artists' community. As a founding member of Libre, Fleming contributed to the structure of the community and the by-laws by which it is still governed. She has continued to spend a portion of her time living and working at Libre since 1968.

Fleming is primarily a sculptor although drawing is an important component of her work. She works in steel, wood, rubber, felt and paper. Her sculpture can be identified by intricate patterns resembling lace, tendrils of smoke, or webs. Her work has been exhibited across the United States, and is included in the collections of the Oakland Museum of California in Oakland, California, the Albuquerque Museum in Albuquerque, New Mexico, the Laumeier Sculpture Park in Sunset Hills, Missouri, the Iris & B. Gerald Cantor Center for Visual Arts at Stanford University. and the Sheldon Museum of Art at the University of Nebraska–Lincoln.

Places
Fleming works in both urban and remote spaces.  Her practice, while not site-specific, draws from the desert and mountain environments surrounding her studios. The cyclical migration between these spaces is a catalyst for the development of her work. She divides her time between Colorado, Nevada, and California.

Teaching
Fleming is a Professor of Fine Arts and the current Chair of the Sculpture Department at California College of the Arts, Oakland, CA. She was awarded CCA's Distinguished Faculty award in 1993. Additionally she has held teaching positions at the San Francisco Art Institute, the Minneapolis College of Art and Design, San Francisco State University, and the Maryland Institute College of Art (MICA).

References

External links 
 Linda Fleming’s Website
 Artist's page at CCA

1945 births
Living people
American women sculptors
American contemporary artists
California College of the Arts faculty
Artists from Pittsburgh
San Francisco Art Institute faculty
Minneapolis College of Art and Design faculty
San Francisco State University faculty
Maryland Institute College of Art faculty
Carnegie Mellon University College of Fine Arts alumni
Sculptors from Pennsylvania
21st-century American women artists